Progressive Convergence (CP) was a political alliance in Chile. The alliance was created on 8 October 2018 and was composed of the Party for Democracy (PPD), the Radical Party (PR) and the Socialist Party (PS).

The alliance was created as a coordination group of Chile's social-democratic and center-left parties after the dissolution of the New Majority coalition, which was defeated in the 2017 general election.

The group Sought to dialogue with other parties and coalitions such as the Communist Party and the Broad Front to oppose Chile Vamos. The alliance was supplanted by the Constituent Unity in 2020.

Composition 
The alliance was consisted of the three parties of the former New Majority.

See also 
 List of political parties in Chile
 New Majority (Chile)
 Chile Vamos
 Broad Front

References

2018 establishments in Chile
2020 disestablishments in Chile
Defunct political party alliances in Chile
Political parties disestablished in 2020
Political parties established in 2018
Progressive Alliance